Ganga Bhakt Singh (1922–2010) was a senior leader of Bharatiya Janata Party from Uttar Pradesh, India, affiliated to the Rashtriya Swayamsevak Sangh. He served as a cabinet minister twice in the Government of Uttar Pradesh in 1967 and 1991 and as the Deputy-Chairman of the State Planning Commission between 1999-2002 under the Chief Minister Rajnath Singh. He was a member of the Sixth Lok Sabha from Shahabad Lok Sabha constituency as well as being a member of the Uttar Pradesh Legislative Assembly for four terms.

His elder brother, Late Shri. Sharda Bhakt Singh was also a senior leader of the Bhartiya Janta Party and had served as the Revenue Minister (Cabinet Minister) of Uttar Pradesh and MLA thrice.

An active social and political worker, Singh was a bachelor and was associated with the organisational work of a number of societies in his constituency and worked for the uplift of rural people.

Singh died on 15 August 2010 at Lucknow, Uttar Pradesh at the age of 88.

References

1922 births
2010 deaths
India MPs 1977–1979
State cabinet ministers of Uttar Pradesh
People from Hardoi district
Bharatiya Jana Sangh politicians
Uttar Pradesh MLAs 2002–2007
Bharatiya Janata Party politicians from Uttar Pradesh
Lok Sabha members from Uttar Pradesh